Al Zarqan (single Zarqani) is a Sunni Muslim tribe, said to be belonging to the family house of prophet Muhammad.

The origin of Al Zarqan
Al Zarqan tribe come from Hejaz in Saudi Arabia, Yemen, Iraq, Libya, Jordan and Iran.

Places of proliferation
They lived in Saudi Arabia, Yemen, Iraq and Jordan  and also in Ahvaz.

Sources

Tribes of Arabia
Yemeni tribes
Tribes of Iraq